Robert Hugill (born 1955) is a British composer, journalist, lecturer and blogger. He runs classical music blog "Planet Hugill".

Opera

The Genesis of Frankenstein (setting a libretto by the composer based on Mary Shelley's Frankenstein) was premiered by the Helios Collective at the CLF Art Cafe, Peckham on 28 October 2015, directed by Ella Marchment, choreography by Sarah-Louise Kristiansen, musical director Noah Mosley.

When a Man Knows (setting a libretto by the composer based on Alan Richardson's play of the same name) was premiered at the Bridewell Theatre, London on 31 March 2011   The production was directed by Ian Caddy and musical director was David Roblou, Dario Dugandzic was the Man and Zoe South the woman.

Other compositions

Three pieces from the Book of Common Prayer for viola and piano was premiered by Rosalind Ventris (viola) and James Willshire (piano) at Cheltenham Cheltenham Contemporary Concerts in Dean Close School, Cheltenham on  11 Feb 2018.

The motet Dominus Illuminatio mea was premiered on 8 December 2016 at Priory Church of the Order of St John, St John's Square, Clerkenwell Road, London, EC1V 4JJ, by London Concord Singers, conductor Jessica Norton as part of the choir's 50th-anniversary concert.

The cycle of 70 motets for the church's year, Tempus per Annum, is available for free download from www.cpdl.org

Chapelle du roi, conductor Alistair Dixon, premiered the motet Videte Miraculum at St John's Smith Square on 19 December 2009.

Recordings

The disc Quickening: Songs by Robert Hugill to English and Welsh poets, released in September 2017 on the Navona Records label features Robert Hugill's settings of poems by Rowan Williams, Ivor Gurney, A. E. Housman and Christina Rossetti performed by Anna Huntley (mezzo-soprano), Johnny Herford (baritone), Rosalind Ventris (viola) and Will Vann (piano). In reviewing the disc for Music-Web International Rob Barnet referred to Hugill's 'candid gift for gracious melody' 

Robert Hugill's songs also feature on the disc Sappho, Shropshire and Supertramp, released in January 2018 on the Divine Art label. The disc features songs by English composers associated with the English Poetry and Song Society performed by Sarah Leonard (singer) (mezzo-soprano), Johnny Herford (baritone) and Nigel Foster (piano). Robert Hugill's songs on the disc include settings of Hart Crane and Rabindranath Tagore.

Robert Hugill's motet, Populos Sion features on Harmonia Sacra and conductor Peter Leech's disc Lux Memoriaque on the Nimbus Alliance label.

References

External links
Personal Website
Planet Hugill classical music blog

1955 births
Living people
British composers